Bassa Mawem (born 9 November 1984) is a French professional speed climber. He qualified for the 2020 Summer Olympics.

He won the overall title in the speed climbing event at the 2018 and 2019 IFSC Climbing World Cup.

On 3 August 2021, Mawem established the first Olympic Record of 5.45 s during the Speed Qualifications, but was unable to compete in the final due to an injury.

His younger brother Mickaël is also a professional climber.

References

External links
 
 
 
 

French rock climbers
Living people
1984 births
People from Nouméa
Sport climbers at the 2020 Summer Olympics
Olympic sport climbers of France
20th-century French people
21st-century French people
IFSC Climbing World Cup overall medalists
Speed climbers